Sir George Reresby Sacheverell Sitwell, 8th Baronet (born 22 April 1967) is a British businessman.

Sitwell has worked as an investment banker, and as head of finance for a film production company, and co-founded an IT staffing group before turning to property development.

Sitwell inherited the Sitwell baronetcy from his uncle, Sir Reresby Sitwell. Due to his father and his uncle being "never in harmony", Sir Reresby bequeathed the Sitwell family seat, Renishaw Hall, Derbyshire, to his daughter Alexandra, Mrs Rick Hayward. Consequently, the house and estate are now separated from the Renishaw baronetcy for the first time in the family's history.

References 

1967 births
Living people
People educated at Eton College
Alumni of the University of Edinburgh
Baronets in the Baronetage of the United Kingdom
21st-century British businesspeople
George
English people of Canadian descent